Manimaran Siddharth (born 3 July 1998) is an Indian cricketer who plays domestic cricket for Tamil Nadu. He is a left-arm orthodox bowler.

Domestic cricket
Siddharth made his Twenty20 debut on 22 November 2019, for Tamil Nadu in the 2019–20 Syed Mushtaq Ali Trophy. He made his first-class debut on 9 December 2019, for Tamil Nadu in the 2019–20 Ranji Trophy. He made his List A debut on 20 February 2021, for Tamil Nadu in the 2020–21 Vijay Hazare Trophy.

Indian Premier League
In the 2020 IPL auction, he was bought by the Kolkata Knight Riders ahead of the 2020 Indian Premier League. In February 2021, Siddharth was bought by the Delhi Capitals in the IPL auction ahead of the 2021 Indian Premier League. He was replaced by Kulwant Khejroliya after an injury.

References

External links
 

1998 births
Living people
Indian cricketers
Tamil Nadu cricketers
Place of birth missing (living people)